The 1727 British general election returned members to serve in the House of Commons of the 7th Parliament of Great Britain to be summoned, after the merger of the Parliament of England and the Parliament of Scotland in 1707. The election was triggered by the death of King George I; at the time, it was the convention to hold new elections following the succession of a new monarch. The Tories, led in the House of Commons by William Wyndham, and under the direction of Bolingbroke, who had returned to the country in 1723 after being pardoned for his role in the Jacobite rising of 1715, lost further ground to the Whigs, rendering them ineffectual and largely irrelevant to practical politics. A group known as the Patriot Whigs, led by William Pulteney, who were disenchanted with Walpole's government and believed he was betraying Whig principles, had been formed prior to the election. Bolingbroke and Pulteney had not expected the next election to occur until 1729, and were consequently caught unprepared and failed to make any gains against the government party.

Summary of the constituencies
See 1796 British general election for details. The constituencies used were the same throughout the existence of the Parliament of Great Britain.

Dates of election
The general election was held between 14 August 1727 and 17 October 1727.

At this period, elections did not take place at the same time in every constituency. The returning officer in each county or parliamentary borough fixed the precise date (see hustings for details of the conduct of the elections).

Results

Seats summary

See also
List of parliaments of Great Britain

References
 British Electoral Facts 1832–1999, compiled and edited by Colin Rallings and Michael Thrasher (Ashgate Publishing Ltd 2000). (For dates of elections before 1832, see the footnote to Table 5.02).

1727 in politics
1727 in Great Britain
1727